Stanley Stephen Awbery (19 July 1888 – 7 May 1969) was a British trade unionist and Labour Party politician who served as the Member of Parliament (MP) for Bristol Central from 1945 to 1964.

Awbery was born in Swansea, and began work at a copperworks aged 13. In 1904 he began his trade union activities when he joined the Dock, Wharf, Riverside and General Labourers' Union. He became the secretary of the Fuel Workers' Branch in 1913, and national auditor of the union in 1919. He became a permanent official with the union in 1920 and in 1926 district secretary at Barry Docks.

He was a member of the Welsh Committee of the Independent Labour Party, becoming chairman in 1929. He was elected to Barry Town Council and was mayor of Barry in 1941. He stood unsuccessfully as Labour Party candidate for the Clitheroe constituency at the 1931 and 1935 general elections. He was selected to contest Bristol Central in 1937, although the anticipated general election was postponed due to the Second World War. He finally entered parliament at the 1945 general election and remained Member of Parliament for Bristol Central until his retirement in 1964.

Awbrey was a keen local historian, and published a number of books on the subject.

References

External links 
 

1888 births
1969 deaths
Labour Party (UK) MPs for English constituencies
Politicians from Swansea
Transport and General Workers' Union-sponsored MPs
UK MPs 1945–1950
UK MPs 1950–1951
UK MPs 1951–1955
UK MPs 1955–1959
UK MPs 1959–1964